Choi Seung-ja (The romanization preferred by the author according to LTI Korea) (Hangul 최승자; born 1952) is a South Korean poet. Her poetry expresses the melancholy of a person facing death. Some critics have described her work as “the moans of pain by someone who has not been loved” (Kim Hyeon) or as "perceiving a world full of lives that have lost their roots . . . and accepting that the loss of one’s roots is a human condition” (Jeong Gwa-ri). Another critic has noted that her poems are “driven by a solitary ego that shuts itself away from a world poisoned by capitalism and resists that world through the language of defiance” (Lee Gwang-ho).

Life 
Choi Seung-ja was born in Yeongi County, South Korea in 1952. She attended high school in Seoul and studied German language and literature at Korea University. She was the editor-in-chief for her school magazine until she was blacklisted for reasons unknown during the Fourth Republic. She was subsequently expelled before she could finish her degree. Following her expulsion, she joined the editing team at a publisher called Hongsungsa, where an alumnus was editor-in-chief. She made her literary debut in 1979 when the journal Literature and Intelligence published five of her poems including “Love of This Age” (이 시대의 사랑). She left Hongsungsa after her debut and devoted herself full-time to writing and translation. In 1993, she participated in the International Writing Program at the University of Iowa. She wrote very little during the 1990s, with Yeonindeul (연인들 Lovers), a 1999 collection of forty poems, being one of her few publications. Her 2010 poetry collection Sseulsseulhaeseo meonameon (쓸쓸해서 머나먼 Lonely and Faraway) marked a new beginning in her writing career. In 2010, she won the Jirisan Literature Prize and Daesan Literary Award. In 2017, her poems were published in The Guardian. She has translated Also sprach Zarathustra: Ein Buch für Alle und Keinen (Thus Spoke Zarathustra), Die Welt des Schweigens (The World of Silence), The Art of Hunger, and The Secret Language of Symbols into Korean.

Writing 
Choi Seung-ja was one of the most lauded South Korean poets in the 1980s. She portrayed objects, lives, eras, and events using metaphors of the body. Such writing was rooted in self-denial and self-hatred, which she expressed in the form of hostility toward the world. Choi's poetry took on a rebellious character partly in response to the oppression of her gender in a male-dominated society, and partly to the Yusin government of the 1970s and the military dictatorship of the 1980s in South Korea. Her poetry was a scathing testimony of a Dark Age and is still widely read today.

Choi's first poetry collection Ishidaeui sarang (이 시대의 사랑 Love of This Age), published in 1981, investigates the underlying truth of all objects to find meaning in a life destroyed by society. In her next works—Jeulgeoun ilgi (즐거운 일기 Merry Diary) (1984), Gieogui jip (기억의 집 House of Memory) (1989), and Nae mudeom, pureugo (내 무덤, 푸르고 My Tomb, Grave) (1993)—Choi continues to reject the world around her and refuses to compromise. Believing that the fundamental meaning of life is lost, she regards life with despair and denial. She describes herself as "a descendant of darkness, a hypnotized body" or as the "priestess of emptiness." Sometimes such sentiments lead to intense masochism, as seen in verses like “Oh I want to be a dog beaten to death / I want to be a carpet made from the skin of a dog beaten to death."

Choi's poetry has grown less fierce and brutal in the 2010s after her hiatus. Her recent works focus on the ennui of life instead. Nevertheless, they still demonstrate an acute awareness of life and the world.

Works 
 <이 시대의 사랑>, 문학과 지성사, 1981 { Love of This Age. Moonji, 1981. }
 <즐거운 일기>, 문학과 지성사, 1984 { Merry Diary. Moonji, 1984. }
 <기억의 집>, 문학과 지성사, 1989 { House of Memory. Moonji, 1989. }
 <내 무덤, 푸르고>, 문학과 지성사, 1993 { My Tomb, Green. Moonji, 1993. }
 <연인들>, 문학동네, 1999 { Lovers. Munhakdongne, 1999. }
 <쓸쓸해서 머나먼>, 문학과 지성사, 2010 { Lonely and Faraway. Moonji, 2010. }
 <물 위에 씌어진>, 천년의 시작, 2011 { Written on the Water. Poem Sijak, 2011. }
 <빈 배처럼 텅 비어>, 문학과 지성사, 2016 { Empty as a Deserted Boat. Moonji, 2016. }

Works in translation 
 Portrait of a Suburbanite: Poems of Choi Seung-ja (2015) 
 Anxiety of words: contemporary poetry by Korean women (2006)
 The Guardian Translation Tuesday: Three poems by Choi Seung-ja
 "For the Second Time in Thirty-Three Years" in Korean Literature Now Summer 2016
 "From Early on, I," "Autumn Like a Dog," "I Remember," "On a Faraway Sea," "A Child," and "A Time Existed" at Korean Poetry in Translation
 El Tiempo Transparente (1996)

Awards 
 2010: Jirisan Literature Prize
 2010: Daesan Literary Award

Further reading 
 이승원, 「우리 모두 함께 가야할 길-최승자 시집 『기억의 집』」, 『현대시학』, 1989.7. { Lee, Seung-won. "The Road We Must All Take Together: Choi Seung-ja's poetry collection House of Memory." Hyeondaesihak, July 1989. }
 김수경, 「언어와 여자의 집-『기억의 집』, 최승자 저」, 『문학정신』, 1989.9. { Kim, Su-kyeong. "Language and the House of Woman: House of Memory by Choi Seung-ja." Munhakjeongsin, September 1989. }
 이광호, 「위반의 시학, 그리고 신체적 사유-최승자를 찾아서」, 『현대시세계』, 1991.2. { Lee, Gwang-ho. "Poetics of Violation and the Body's Freedom: In Search of Choi Seung-ja." Modern Poetry World, February 1991. }
 이상희, 「사랑과 죽음의 전문가-최승자」, 『현대시세계』, 1991.2. { Lee, Sang-hui. "The Specialist on Love and Death: Choi Seung-ja." Modern Poetry World, February 1991. }
 정효구, 「최승자 론-죽음과 상처의 시」, 『현대시학』, 1991.5. { Jeong, Hyo-gu. "Discussion on Choi Seung-ja: Poetry of Death and Hurt." Hyeondaesihak, May 1991. }
 엄경희, 「여성시에 대한 기대지평의 전환-최승자 시를 중심으로」, 『이화어문론집』, 1994.2. { Eom, Gyeong-hui. "The Change in the Horizon of Expectations on Poetry by Women, including Choi Seung-ja." Journal of Ehwa Korean Language and Literature, February 1994. }
 장석주, 「죽음, 아버지, 자궁, 그리고 시쓰기-최승자론」, 『문학과 사회』, 1994.2. { Jang, Seok-ju. "Death, Father, Womb, and Writing Poetry: A Discussion on Choi Seung-ja." Literature and Society, February 1994. }
 박순희, 「최승자 시에 나타난 해체주의적 경향성」, 『성신어문학』, 1995.2. { Park, Sun-hui. "Deconstructivist Tendencies in Choi Seung-ja's Poetry." Sungshin Language and Literature. February 1995. }
 김진수, 「길이 끝난 곳에서 시작되는 길-최승자, 백무산의 시집」, 『문학과 사회』, 1999.5. { Kim, Jin-su. “The Road that Starts at a Dead End: Choi Seung-ja and Baek Mu-san's Poetry Collections." Literature and Society, May 1999. }
 박주택, 「살아 달이고 우려낸 즙의 시학-최승자 시집, 『연인들』, 최승자 저 [서평]」, 『현대시학』, 1999.5. { Park, Ju-taek. "The Poetics of an Essence Lived, Brewed, and Steeped: Choi Seung-ja's Poetry Collections, Lovers, and 'Book Review.'" Hyeondaesihak, May 1999. }
 김용희, 「죽음에 대한 시적 승리에 관하여-말의 공간, 죽음의 공간, 최승자의 시 읽기」, 『평택대논문집』, 1999.12. { Kim, Yong-hui. “On the Poetic Victory of Death: Space of Speech, Space of Death, Reading Choi-Seung-ja's Poems." Pyeongtaek Review, December 1999. }
 이재복, 「몸과 자궁의 언어-최승자 론」, 『현대시학』, 2002.2. { Lee, Jae-bok. "Language of the Body and Womb: A Discussion on Choi Seung-ja." Hyeondaesihak, February 2002. }
 「미 아이오와대 유학 5개월/일기 모음집 펴낸 시인 최승자 씨[인터뷰]」, 『경향신문』, 1995.4.22. { "Interview with Poet Choi Seung-ja on Publishing Diary Entries Describing Her Five-Month IWP Residency." Kyunghyang Daily News, April 22, 1995. }
 「「어떤 나무들은」, 최승자 저 [구효서가 권하는 한권의 책]」, 『경향신문』, 1995.7.25. { "Gu Hyo-seo's Book Pick: Some Trees by Choi Seung-ja." Kyunghyang Daily News, July 25, 1995. }
 황현산, 「최승자의 「우라누스를 위하여」」, 『한국일보』, 1995.9.5. { Hwang, Hyeon-san. "Choi Seung-ja's 'For Uranus.'" Hankook Ilbo, September 5, 1995. }
 「[시가있는아침] 최승자 돌아와 이제」, 『중앙일보』, 2000.4.27. { "Morning with Poetry: Come Back Choi Seung-ja." Joongang Ilbo, April 27, 2000. }
 [네이버 지식백과] 최승자 [崔勝子] (한국여성문인사전, 2006. 11. 28., 태학사) { "Choi Seung-ja" in Dictionary of Korean Women Writes (Thaehaksa, November 28, 2006), quoted in Naver Encyclopedia. }

References

External links 
 "Feminism for All" in Korean Literature Now Fall 2017
 "The Body in Contemporary Korean Literature" in Korean Literature Now Summer 2016
 "The Rise of a Modern Sensibility" in Korean Literature Now Winter 2010
 "Rediscovering the Self Through Lyricism" in Korean Literature Now Winter 2010

1952 births
20th-century South Korean poets
Living people
21st-century South Korean poets
South Korean women poets
21st-century South Korean women writers
20th-century South Korean women writers
People from South Chungcheong Province
Korea University alumni